Wenquan (i.e. "Warm Springs") is a small settlement in the Qinghai province of China.
Administratively, it is part of Tanggula Town, which is an exclave of Golmud County-level city, Haixi Mongol and Tibetan Autonomous Prefecture.

Originally constructed in 1955, Wenquan is one of the small settlements serving  China National Highway 109 (the main road into Tibet), and, later, the Qinghai-Tibet Railway.

Geography
The settlement is located in the area where the highway and the railway cross the Tanggula Mountains, the mountain range in the center of the Qinghai-Tibet Plateau. It is located a few tens of kilometers north of the Tanggula Pass, where the road and the railway enter from Qinghai Province into the Tibetan Autonomous Region.

Travel books also inflate the size and elevation of this settlement.

Some 20–30 km to the north of Wenquan, in the same highway/railway corridor, detailed maps (e.g.,  on Google Maps) show Wenquan Military Station.

According to bicycle tourists who visited the place in 2000, Wenquan, like other settlements in the region, was "small. Just a few buildings." There were indeed warm springs in the area. They described the location, based on their maps, as being  "at 4,800+ metres" elevation, an elevation confirmed (at 4,850 to 4,870 meters) by SRTM data.

Climate
Wenquan has a tundra climate (Köppen classification ET) bordering very closely on a subarctic climate (Köppen classification Dfc). It has cool summers with some precipitation and cold, dry winters. Due to its high elevation, there is high diurnal temperature variation.

Footnotes

See also
List of towns and villages in Tibet
List of highest cities in the world
List of highest towns by country
La Rinconada, Peru
Tuiwa

   

Populated places in Qinghai
Haixi Mongol and Tibetan Autonomous Prefecture